The Boat Show is an Australian lifestyle television program hosted by Glenn Ridge, who is also Executive Producer. This is not to be confused with 31 Digital's (Briz 31) new series by the same name currently covering the marine industry in South-East Queensland. The Boat Show features stories about boating, from people who are passionate about their boats and yachts, to the latest gadgets and boating tips and boating locations both in Australia and abroad. Presenters include Steven Jacobs, Grace McClure, Teisha Lowry and Kellie Johns. It began screening in 2003 on the Nine Network.

References

See also
 List of Australian television series
 List of Nine Network programs

Australian non-fiction television series
Nine Network original programming
2003 Australian television series debuts